Oranges and Sunshine is a 2010 Australian drama film directed by Jim Loach as his directorial debut. It stars Emily Watson, Hugo Weaving and David Wenham, with a screenplay by Rona Munro, based on the 1994 book Empty Cradles by Margaret Humphreys.

Plot
The film is based on the true story of Margaret Humphreys, a social worker from Nottingham who uncovered the scandal of "home children", a scheme of forcibly relocating poor children from the United Kingdom to Australia and Canada.

Margaret reunites estranged families, who are situated in Australia and the UK, and brings worldwide attention to the cause.

Deported children were promised "oranges and sunshine" but they got hard labour and life in institutions such as Keaney College in Bindoon, Western Australia. Many were given to the Congregation of Christian Brothers, where they suffered physical and sexual abuse.

Cast

 Emily Watson as Margaret Humphreys
 Hugo Weaving as Jack
 David Wenham as Len
 Richard Dillane as Merv Humphreys
 Tara Morice as Pauline
 Stuart Wolfenden as Bill
 Kate Rutter as Vera 
 Lorraine Ashbourne as Nicky
 Federay Holmes as Charlotte
 Helen Grayson as Bureaucrat
 Ruth Rickman as Orphan
 Harvey Scrimshaw as Ben
 Molly Windsor as Rachel
 Neil Pigot as James
 Tammy Wakefield as Susan
 Adam Morgan as the Intruder
 Neil May as the Commuter
 Adam Tedder as the Doctor
 Greg Stone as Bob
 Aisling Loftus as Susie
Geoff Morrell as Walter
Chandran Owen as Pointing man in the street

Production

Filming
Filming took place in Adelaide, South Australia, in Nottingham, and at Wirksworth in Derbyshire. Some interior scenes were filmed at the University of Leicester, Leicestershire, in Nottingham County Hall and in the porte-cochère of Nottingham railway station. Other locations that appear are a train on the Ecclesbourne Valley Railway; Australia House in London and an overview of Nottingham Council House and the Old Market Square.

A casting session was held in Nottingham to find one boy and one girl for the roles of Margaret's children.

Reception
Rotten Tomatoes gives the film a score of 71% based on reviews from 68 critics.

Accolades

References

External links 
 
 
 Sixteen Films
 orangesandsunshine.com.au 
 Child Migrants Trust Official website for reuniting children

2010 films
2010 drama films
2010s English-language films
Australian drama films
British drama films
Drama films based on actual events
Films about forced migration
Films about post-traumatic stress disorder
Films set in the 1980s
2010s British films